The AN/UYK-44 is the standard 16-bit minicomputer of the United States Navy. The AN/UYK-44 was developed in the early 1980s by Sperry Corporation and was completed in early 1984. The AN/UYK-44 was used in surface ships, submarines, ground C4I platforms, radar and missile control systems. The system was designed to replace the older AN/UYK-20 model.

Technical specifications
The AN/UYK-44 had 2 million words of memory, approximately 4 MB in modern terms, and operated at 0.9 MIPS.

The system has relatively large I/O capability and has a MIL-STD-1397 point-to-point I/O bus running at 250K words/s. The system was built around the use of "Standard Electronic Modules" (SEM) for logic implementation. These modules had double-sided surface mount integrated circuits and ceramic substrates for interconnect and cooling.

See also
 AN/AYK-14
 AN/UYK-20
 CMS-2 programming language

References

Military electronics of the United States
Military computers
Military equipment introduced in the 1980s
16-bit computers